Beachbend, also known as the William H. Dixon Estate, is a national historic district located at Nissequogue in Suffolk County, New York.  The district encompasses an estate with five contributing buildings and two contributing structures.  The estate house is a large 18th-century house with alterations completed in 1924.  It is a two-story, wood frame, five bay structure with a center hall plan.  Also on the property are a contributing "L" shaped barn, a cottage, a pump house. two sheds, and a well cover.

It was added to the National Register of Historic Places in 1993.

References

Houses on the National Register of Historic Places in New York (state)
Colonial Revival architecture in New York (state)
National Register of Historic Places in Smithtown (town), New York
Houses in Suffolk County, New York
Historic districts on the National Register of Historic Places in New York (state)